Shashi Gupta (born 3 April 1964 in Delhi, India) is a former Indian Test and One Day International cricketer and currently a National Selector of the Indian Women's Cricket Team at the Board of Control for Cricket in India (BCCI). She has played a total of 13 Tests and 20 ODIs.

References

1964 births
Delhi women cricketers
India women One Day International cricketers
India women Test cricketers
Indian women cricketers
Living people